Wen Meihui (born 1931) is a Chinese translator. She is a member of the China Democratic League.

She is among the first few in China who translated the works of Joseph Rudyard Kipling's into Chinese language.

Biography
Wen was born in Wuhan, Hubei in 1931, her father was a local officer.

Wen secondary studied at Nankai School. She graduated from Peking University in 1953, where she majored in English, she studied English language and literature under Zhu Guangqian, Bian Zhilin and Feng Zhi.

Wen started to publish works in 1956.

In 1966, Mao Zedong launched the Cultural Revolution, Wen was sent to the May Seventh Cadre Schools to work in Yanqing County. After the Cultural Revolution, she was appointed an editor to the Chinese Academy of Social Sciences.

Wen joined the China Writers Association in 1979.

Works
 The Jungle Book (Joseph Rudyard Kipling)
 Tiger! Tiger! (Joseph Rudyard Kipling)
 (Joseph Rudyard Kipling)
 The Fox, The Captain's Doll (D. H. Lawrence)
 (Scotus)
 (Georgette Heyer)


Awards
 Chinese Translation Association – Senior Translator (2004)

Personal life
Wen was married to Lin Hongliang, who also a translator.

References

1931 births
Writers from Wuhan
Peking University alumni
People's Republic of China translators
English–Chinese translators
Living people
20th-century Chinese translators
21st-century Chinese translators